John Curtis Perry also known as John Perry (born 18 July 1930) is an East Asian and Oceanic studies professor and historian. He is the Henry Willard Denison Professor Emeritus of History at the Fletcher School of Law and Diplomacy, Tufts University. He was also the director of that school's Maritime Studies program and founding president of the Institute for Global Maritime Studies, until his retirement in 2014.

Perry has written several history books and articles on topics including Pacific Asia-US relations, the American occupation of Japan, American expansionism toward the Pacific Ocean, and Singapore's history. His writing style has been characterized for artfully conveying history to the general reader with pith, wit, and clarity. The Japanese government awarded him the Imperial decoration of the Order of the Sacred Treasure for his contributions to US-Japan relations.

Education

Perry attended Friends schools in Washington, DC and New York City, subsequently going to Yale College for his bachelor's degree in Chinese Studies, graduating in 1952. At Yale he also pursued a master of arts in Foreign Area Studies.

Later, he attended Harvard University for his PhD in history, concluding in 1962 with his thesis Great Britain and the Imperial Japanese Navy, 1858-1905. His doctoral advisors were Edwin O. Reischauer, a japanologist, and Robert G. Albion, a maritime historian; both the leading scholars in their fields at the time.

Career

From 1962 until 1966, Perry was Assistant Professor of History at Connecticut College, and from 1966 to 1980, he was Assistant Professor, Professor of History, and Director of the East Asian Studies Program at Carleton College. In 1980, he joined the Fletcher School of Law and Diplomacy, becoming the Henry Willard Denison Chair of History in 1981.

Perry was a visiting research associate at Harvard's Fairbank Center for Chinese Studies from 1976 to 1979, and at the Japan Institute (later renamed Edwin O. Reischauer Institute of Japanese Studies) from 1979 to 1980.

In his early career, his teaching and research focus was American-East Asian relations, especially with Japan. In the early 2000s, he shifted his focus to maritime studies in order to explore the history of human interactions via the sea. From 1985 to 1997, he was the director of the North Pacific Program, and then director of the Maritime Studies program. He taught courses including Maritime History and Globalization and The International Relations of the China Seas.

Notable students of his include Alan M. Wachman, a scholar of cross-strait relations and Sino-U.S. relations, and Sung-Yoon Lee a scholar of Korean and East Asian studies, and specialist on North Korea. Perry became Lee's doctoral advisor, and developed a life-long mentor-mentee relationship.

Their research, was published in a book The Flight of the Romanovs: A Family Saga (1999), the first book to provide a biography of the family as a whole. Perry and Pleshakov, at the invitation of the Russian government, attended in 1998 the burial of the remains of Tsar Nicholas II and his family.

Perry is the founding president of the Institute for Global Maritime Studies, a non-profit research organization. He served as IGMS' president from 2007 to 2014, continuing to be the Chair of the Board afterwards. He has been a consultant to several organizations, including the Policy Planning Branch of the Ministry of Foreign Affairs of the Republic of Korea, the Japan Export Trade Promotion Organization (currently the Japan External Trade Organization, JETRO), and Rhumb Line LLC.  He also served as a director of the Japan America Society of New Hampshire, and is a member of the Massachusetts Historical Society since 1990. He is a senior advisor and director of the Japan Society of Boston.

In 2015 Perry retired from active teaching, while continuing to pursue other academic activities. That same year it was announced that he was finishing a book about the implausibility of Singapore's success. That book, titled Singapore: Unlikely Power was published in 2017 by Oxford University Press.

Family

In 1957, Perry married Sarah Hollis French, of Farmington, Connecticut. They have five children and ten grandchildren.

Honors

In 1991, the Japanese Government awarded Perry the imperial decoration of the Order of the Sacred Treasure, Third Class (Gold Rays with Neck Ribbon), for his contributions to American-Japanese relations.

In 2000, Fletcher students and friends established the John Curtis Perry Fellowship for a deserving Fletcher student.

In 2018 colleagues and students of Perry came together to publish a book in his honor, Eurasia’s Maritime Rise and Global Security: From the Indian Ocean to Pacific Asia and the Arctic. In it, Admiral (ret.) and Fletcher School Dean James G. Stavridis remarked that the book was created "in celebration" of Perry, with the book's editor Geoffrey F. Gresh further noting that the volume "emerged from a workshop on the future of the world's oceans hosted at the Fletcher School of Law and Diplomacy, Tufts University, in the Spring of 2015 to honor the legacy and groundbreaking work of John Curtis Perry".

Writings
Perry has been praised for his skillful, pithy, and enjoyable writing style to convey history to the reader. Historian Roger Dingman has said that "Perry writes clearly, succinctly and wittily". Raymond A. Esthus compares Perry's style to "sumi-e, the Japanese paintings that portray a scene or suggest a world of feeling with a few skillful brush strokes". Clayton James said of Beneath the Eagle's Wings: Americans in Occupied Japan "It is a model for brevity, lucidity, coherence, balance, objectivity, and perceptiveness". Walter A. McDougall writes of Perry, "He has a keen eye for [literary] images" and Roger Dingman commented, "He has an eye for the pithy quote and the illustrative incident".

The American occupation of Japan

Summary
In the book Beneath the Eagle's Wings: Americans in Occupied Japan (1980), Perry asserted that the post-WWII American occupation of Japan was a major success, despite the odds. Americans came into Japan full of vitality and energy, convinced of the superiority of their own culture and its suitability for Japan, and unencumbered by much knowledge of Japan's history or culture. These American characteristics might have been reasons for failure, but paradoxically the occupation was an extraordinary success: "a landmark in human history," Perry states.

However, despite how little Americans knew of the Japanese, the occupation policy actually did not clash head-on with Japanese ways of doing things. The nation was ruled through the Japanese government, making local military government units superfluous. The technique most widely used by occupation officials was hortatory: advice, counsel, and visits by experts invited to Japan by the supreme commander of the allied powers. This worked because of the extreme deference shown to the occupiers by the Japanese people and their leaders. Yet, although the occupation did remake the social, political and economic structures of Japan, its culture displayed a great degree of resilience. His stress is on the fascinating ways in which the occupiers and the occupied adjusted and adapted to their unprecedented encounter and, thanks to good will on both sides, made the Occupation's liabilities as insignificant as possible.

Reception
The book received generally positive reviews, considered as an engaging and illustrative work recommended for the general public. Esthus characterized the book as a "fine interpretive portrait of the American experience in occupied Japan", developed with "perception and literary grace", and Clayton James called it a "first rate" account on the occupation of Japan, "demonstrating masterful knowledge of the period and its literature," making it "a delightful brief study that both general readers and teachers in the field will appreciate." Alan Miller from The New Republic considered the work an "engaging" book that "doubtless will be a cornerstone for future historians intending to construct the comprehensive study of the Occupation". On the other hand, Dingman was critical of the work, pointing to a lack of research and citation of sources and the "painting" of a "rosy view of the American occupation", while he still positively evaluated Perry's literary skills. Differing from Dingman, McDonald at the Boston Globe, judged the book to be balanced, noting that "not everything was rosy" in Perry's narration, and further noted that "Perry almost apologizes for the fact that that this is not a 'scholarly' work, which could take volumes, but this book is precise enough and includes relevant details. By being readable enough for the layman (...) it will reach a greater audience, and it should. There are lessons for today and tomorrow in the history of the occupation".

History of US-East Asia relations (1784-1975)

Summary
The book Sentimental Imperialists: The American Experience in East Asia (1981, co-authored with James Thomson and Peter W. Stanley) recounts the American experience of East Asia, from approximately 1784 until the fall of Saigon in 1975, discerning four major underlying patterns: competitive nationalism, mutual ethnocentrism, multilateral ignorance, and "a distinctive American sense of mission to 'do good' that has been the driving force behind American imperialism in East Asia".

The New York Times summarized the book as "a description and deflation of a series of illusions: the illusion of a commercial pot-of-gold at the end of a Pacific rainbow, the illusion that the United States had an attainable destiny to convert China to Christianity and modern democracy, the illusion that it was within American power to build a united, anti-Communist China after 1945 and the illusion that the Vietnam war was a test of America's dedication to freedom. Underlying all these illusions was the unstated assumption that Americans were active and Asians passive and that the outcome of any transaction was determined by what Americans thought and did. This assumption united the missionary enthusiasts of the 19th century, the exponents of the United States as China's political savior and guide to the 20th century, the McCarthyites searching for those who 'lost China,' and the Johnsonian visionaries dreaming of Mekong River Authorities while directing the fighting in Vietnam from computerized and air conditioned command centers."

Reception
Reviewers noted that three historians, established scholars respectively on American relations with China, the Philippines, and Japan, were beneficiaries of having been disciples of Edwin O. Reischauer and John K. Fairbank (who contributed a foreword), the leading historical interpreters of American relations with Japan and China respectively during the previous three decades. While the authors were East Asian specialists, they remained abreast of American history, being able to provide a balanced history of American-East Asian relations. It was also noted that this book was the first to provide a comprehensive overview of the topic; before then the history of US-East Asia relations having only been examined in fragments. The authors developed the book for the general reader, bringing a comprehensive text that shatters the American sentimentality and replaces it with a realistic historical portrait that highlights the multicultural complexity of East Asian countries. Several reviewers noted a lack of bibliography and footnotes, while others also recommended the book not only for the general public, but also for students, specialists, and policy makers.

Sentimental Imperialists received mostly positive reviews from academic and journalistic critics. It was welcomed by Kenneth Shewmaker as a "thoughtful overview" and "a masterpiece of condensation and multicultural analysis," and went on to say the authors "effectively combined their expertise to fashion an impressive multicultural study that cogently encapsulates two hundred years of American-East Asian relations". Cohen also evaluated the book positively, deeming several of its chapters "superb, (...) well-written, thoughtful, and informative", and Van Alstyne said he was inclined to "second the praise lavished upon it by a number of prominent writers quoted on the dust jacket." Kwok recommended that "policymakers and general readers ought to have this book on their shelves, after attentive perusal".

Elizabeth Peer from Newsweek deemed the book "impressive" and deserving of a "thoughtful audience". Daniel Yergin from The Boston Globe appraised the work as "lively and thoughtful", and "the result is a wise, literate, illuminating exploration that will be of considerable interest to the curious general reader as well as the specialist".Gaddis Smith writing for The New York Times lamented the lack of references, by noting that "so fine a book as this should not omit entirely what is often disparaged as 'scholarly paraphernalia.' ", but acclaimed the authors' use of "a great river of scholarship which they adapt, synthesize and condense with great skill". Smith and Leonard from The New York Times also characterized the book as a straightforward, cogent, readable and intelligent survey. The book was included in The New York Times Notable books of the year list, and was also recommended by The Washington Post.

American pioneering in the Pacific Ocean

Summary
In Facing West: Americans and the Opening of the Pacific (1995), Perry explored the attempts and successes by individuals in connecting the North Pacific with sail, steam, and aviation. He stated that the book was "concerned with people, not policy. The United States had no policy for bridging the Pacific [before WWII]." Furthermore, he mostly avoided referring to wars and geopolitical struggles, and rather focused on the vision, entrepreneurship, and courage of Americans who strove to bridge the Pacific. "American activity was largely private, not governmental; individual and not collective; sporadic, not systematic", Perry said, and Americans were propelled by the lure of profitable commerce and a sense of destiny to be the dominant force in the Pacific. Perry concluded that, "although Americans failed to grasp the Orient as they hoped, the power of the myth that pushed them there enabled them to do something bigger, something real. More than any other people, Americans pulled the North Pacific region together and created the essential framework for the long-anticipated Pacific era".

History of Singapore's rise

Summary

In his book Singapore: Unlikely Power (Oxford University Press, 2017) Perry brings together his scholarship in East Asia and Maritime history, and explores the history of Singapore, of how it rose to world prominence, from its Malay beginnings seven centuries ago, to its accelerated development in the 19th and 20th centuries, and up to the present day.

Perry highlights how Singapore is not a purely colonial European creation, but a Malay enclave called Temasek or Singapura, that recent archeological findings show that it goes back seven centuries. Drawn by trade between China and southeast Asia, Temasek attracted the Chinese diaspora, with a large sinic community making Temasek, and later Singapore, their home. Noways Singapore is the "largest Chinese city outside China".

Perry explains Singapore's unlikely success for a tapestry of reasons that include its location and geography, historical luck, complementary cultures, and a deft and pragmatic political leadership and governance.

Singapore has no natural resources except for its natural deep-water port shielded from typhoons, pushing the city-state to be always open to international trade. First it took advantage of regional trade, and with the opening of the Suez Canal in 1869 and its strategic location in the Malacca strait it became the most important port along the world's most busy maritime route. With the British arrival in the 1819 and the creation of the modern Singapore, its international connections grew as it meshed with the global reach of the British empire. Perry explores how Stamford Raffles played an important role in the colonial beginnings of the city. In addition, advancements elsewhere such as the invention of the Telegraph gave Singapore greater prominence.

Singapore was fortunate to have its independence in 1965 coincide with a leap in global wealth and integration, and technological advancements in maritime shipping (the large bulk carrier, containerization). However, these advances combined with Singapore's natural maritime advantages would alone not have been enough to support the sustenance of all its population. Under the skillful leadership and "technocratic brilliance" of Lee Kuan Yew, the country pursued a policy of pragmatism, where instead of blaming the british for their colonial rule, it embraced the traditions of British law, order, stability, openness to outside world, and free trade. Similarly Singapore did not remain bitter after Japan's "cruel" occupation during World War II, instead embracing the Japanese for what they could offer: technology and capital to develop Singapore's industry.

Singapore also embraced its ethnic and cultural diversity, combining the British tradition of stability and openness, while taking advantage of the Chinese entrepreneurial urge and skill. The government moreover strived to create an attractive environment for businessmen, developing a city with cleanliness and greenery.

Perry describes the founding prime minister Lee Kuan Yew as authoritarian and ambitious, who commanded respect through the sharpness of his intellect and his tongue, and with the ability to identify extraordinarily talented lieutenants. Perry characterizes Singapore's political system as a republic, not a democracy, in which one party has ruled the country since its independence. However, elections take place and the government is attuned to the needs of its citizenry. It also counts with highly a skillful and corrupt-free body of civil servants, offering high prestige and pay that is competitive with the private sector. The government has developed a culture of innovation, adaptation, and embracing change, of paying constant attention to doing things better, improving logistics, rebuilding the country with world-class infrastructure and connectivity with the rest of the world, and in developing a healthy, skilled, and hard-working labor force (currently with an emphasis in the knowledge and IT economy) in an atmosphere of industrial peace. Singaporeans keep a sense of vulnerability in their great dependence of factors beyond their control, which keeps them alert, flexible, and innovative.

Perry emphasizes that the case of Singapore is unique; it is not a model for anybody but it does offer lessons. The first lesson is adaptability and pragmatism in climbing the economic ladder. Another lesson is on forgiving the sins of the past for the sake of a more peaceful and prosperous future. It also shows the value of creating an attractive environment for business investments.

Reception
Elizabeth C. Economy, Director for Asia Studies at the Council on Foreign Relations praised the book calling it a "wonderful" book, and a "terrific and engaging read" she recommends to all. Economy also referred to it as "a very big book about a very small country" that "really helped us understand why Singapore is important and an unlikely power". She remarked that the book skillfully analyses the economic and structural factors that helped shape Singapore's success, and that what the "book also does so very well is to identify some really interesting figures in Singapore's history that also played an outsized role in determining the development path of the country". Kirkus reviews deemed the book a "brief, affectionate", and "compelling" portrait of the country, but also thought it "incomplete and surprisingly discursive". On the other hand, Daniel Moss from Bloomberg differed from Kirkus by characterizing the book as an "incredible historical and economic narrative".

List of publications

Books

Published in Japanese as "Nishi E!" 西へ！　アメリカ人の太平洋開拓史 (PHP研究所, 1998)

Book chapters

Monographs

Academic articles

Short essays

Podcasts
 Revolution at sea, 2020-2021. CC-BY-SA

References

External links

Official website of John C. Perry
Institute for Global Maritime Studies

Video: "Ruminations on Oceanic Revolution: A Saltwater Perspective on Modern History" lecture at S. Rajaratnam School of International Studies
Video: John Perry's Farewell Lecture "Valedictory Musings"
Podcast interview: Never Mind the Chewing Gum, Singapore is Global Trade Colossus (Bloomberg interview on Perry's 2017 book)
Podcast interview: Council on Foreign Relations' Asia Unbound podcast: interview with Perry on his book Singapore: Unlikely Power

International relations scholars
1930 births
Harvard University alumni
Yale University alumni
Connecticut College faculty
Carleton College faculty
The Fletcher School at Tufts University faculty
Living people
American maritime historians